Goteo is a Spanish crowdfunding site.

Goteo may also refer to:

 "Goteo" (song), by Duki
 "Goteo", a song by Paloma Mami
 Goteo, a 2021 EP by Sangre Nueva, DJ Python and Florentino